Coleophora biskraensis is a moth of the family Coleophoridae. It is found in Algeria and Egypt.

References

biskraensis
Moths described in 1952
Moths of Africa